Dan Sarginson (born 26 May 1993) is a retired England and England Knights international rugby league footballer who previously played as a  or , for the Salford Red Devils.

Sarginson played for the London Broncos and the Wigan Warriors over two separate spells in the Super League. He has also played for the Gold Coast Titans in the NRL.

On 10 March 2023, Sarginson left Salford by mutual agreement. However, an official statement from Salford, did not mention anything as to why he left the club.

On 13 March, it was revealed that sarginson had retired from the sport with immediate effect, to "persue a new career".

Background
Sarginson was born in Perth, Western Australia.

Career

Early life and career
Sarginson was raised in Hemel Hempstead, where he attended Cavendish School, and played for England as a schoolboy. He played for Hemel Stags at junior level before joining Super League side Harlequins RL.

London Broncos
Sarginson made his début for Harlequins (now London Broncos) and scored a try in the 70-0 victory over Gateshead Thunder in the Challenge Cup match at Gateshead International Stadium on Friday 6 May 2011, and made his Super League début for Harlequins and scored two tries in the 18-26 defeat by Salford City Reds at The Willows, Salford on Friday 1 July 2011.

Sarginson was offered a four year contract by the London Broncos in 2012 but refused to sign the deal.  After this he was injured on-and-off for the majority of his time in London and went on to play just 51 times for the capital Super League side, scoring 17 tries.  On 18 October 2013, Wigan announced that they had signed the out-of-contract Sarginson for the 2014 and 2015 Super League seasons.

Wigan Warriors

Sarginson's performances for the Wigan side earned him a nomination for Super League's Young Player of the Year for the 2014 season, but he would lose out to Daryl Clark of the Castleford Tigers.

Sarginson played in the 2014 Super League Grand Final defeat by St. Helens at Old Trafford.

His injury record improved and he was mainly available for selection during his first spell at Wigan.  Sarginson played in the 2016 Super League Grand Final victory over Warrington at Old Trafford.

Gold Coast Titans

On 29 March 2016, Sarginson announced that he would leave the Super League, and join the National Rugby League club, Gold Coast for the 2017 and 2018 seasons. 
He made six appearances for Gold Coast during the 2017 NRL season before suffering a season-ending shoulder injury.

Return to Wigan
On 13 December 2017, the Gold Coast club agreed to release Sarginson who had made few appearances and faced a court case in his time in Australia.  Wigan re-signed Sarginson on a two-year deal. On his return he was handed the number 3 shirt vacated by Anthony Gelling.

After starting in the first two matches of the season he missed the next two months with a recurrence of a shoulder injury which restricted his appearances whilst at the Gold Coast. On his return to the team he scored his first try of the season against the Catalans Dragons before missing a months of action with an ankle injury a few weeks later. A try against Hull FC was followed a week later by another injury ruling him out for another month before his return to the side against St Helens. A try against the Castleford Tigers and a brace against St Helens followed as he found some of the form which helped the Wigan club lift the Super League trophy in 2016. After a resounding victory over St Helens he received the news that his younger brother had died, as the Wigan club gathered around him, he decided to play just days later against Wakefield Trinity. After an emotional minutes silence Sarginson helped defeat Wakefield to keep Wigan's unbeaten run going.
Sarginson played in the 2018 Super League Grand Final victory over Warrington at Old Trafford.

Salford Red Devils
Sarginson signed for Salford for the 2020 season, and would have appeared in the 2020 Challenge Cup Final at Wembley had he not tested positive for COVID-19

International career
He was part of the England squad for the 2014 Four Nations tournament.

Sarginson was selected in England's 24-man squad for the 2016 Four Nations.

Career statistics

References

External links

(archived by web.archive.org) Gold Coast Titans profile
Wigan Warriors profile
SL profile
(archived by web.archive.org) Profile at londonbroncosrl.com
Gateshead 0-70 Harlequins
Salford 26-18 Harlequins

1993 births
Living people
English rugby league players
England Knights national rugby league team players
England national rugby league team players
English people of Australian descent
English people of New Zealand descent
Australian expatriate sportspeople in England
Gold Coast Titans players
Hemel Stags players
London Broncos players
Rugby league centres
Rugby league five-eighths
Rugby league fullbacks
Rugby league halfbacks
Rugby league players from Perth, Western Australia
Salford Red Devils players
Wigan Warriors players